Peter Ryom (born 31 May 1937 in Copenhagen) is a Danish musicologist.  He is internationally known as the author of the Ryom-Verzeichnis, the now-standard catalogue of the works of Antonio Vivaldi. The number of a composition in the Ryom Verzeichnis (Ryom catalogue) is always prefaced by the abbreviation RV.

Partial bibliography

References

1937 births
Living people
Danish musicologists
People from Copenhagen
20th-century musicologists
21st-century musicologists